Honorary titles (professor, reader, lecturer) in academia may be conferred on persons in recognition of contributions by a non-employee or by an employee beyond regular duties. This practice primarily exists in the UK and Germany, as well as in many of the universities and colleges of the United States, Australia, Hong Kong, Taiwan, China, New Zealand, Japan, Denmark, and Canada.

Examples of such titles are Honorary Professor, Honorary Fellow, Honorary Senior Research Fellow, Honorary Reader, Honorary Lecturer (normally applies to non-teaching staff, who give occasional lectures), Visiting Fellow (normally applies to students carrying out further studies and research programmes), Industrial Fellow.

Honorary Professor 

In the UK, this is the highest title to be awarded to individuals whom the university wish to appoint, honor, and
to work with. These individuals are not university staff nor employees. An external person is usually recommended by an internal university academic staff, and recommended for approval by the head of department, for which the documents are then forwarded to faculty dean, vice president and president (or deputy vice chancellor) for approval.

Examples of UK universities who award honorary professorships are University of Essex, University of Manchester,
Brunel University, Middlesex University, University of Bristol, Leicester University, University of Exeter, etc. 
Procedures for evaluation and approval are overseen by university personnel or registrar office. Appointment is made formally by an appointment letter, for a fixed period of time (usually three years) and renewal is possible.
Honorary professors are expected to contribute to the department of the university through giving seminars and joint research with university staffs. Requirements vary from university to university but contributions are expected from the appointee.

In Taiwan, more titles are used to recognize different levels of individuals. They are (in descending order of hierarchy):
 Honorary Distinguished Chair Professor
 Honorary Chair Professor
 Honorary Distinguished Professor
 Honorary Professor
 Honorary Associate Professor
 Honorary Assistant Professor

In China, top universities like Fudan University, Tsinghua University and Peking University have awarded Honorary Professorships. Recent recipients include Prof. Peter Bruce from Oxford, Prof. Reinhart Poprawe from Aachen Germany and Professor Thomas Sargent, Nobel Memorial Prize winner in Economics in 2011.

In Australia, Australian Catholic University (ACU), University of Queensland, RMIT, University of Western Australia, University of Wollongong, University of Canberra and Macquarie University all allow the appointment of honorary professors.

In New Zealand, University of Otago, University of Waikato, and University of Auckland also have provisions for the appointment of honorary professors. Recently, Sir Richard Taylor was appointed honorary professor at Massey University. Prof. Mike Murphy of the Mitochondrial Biology Unit at University of Cambridge was appointed to honorary professor at University of Otago in 2016.

In Denmark, the honorary professor title is conferred in recognition of a person's special contribution to the subject area associated with faculty's activities. Honorary professors are expected to:

 participate in research partnerships
 give lectures
 participate in PhD co-supervision or PhD examination committee

Although honorary professors are not paid a salary, the following expenses are usually compensated:

 travel and accommodation during visits to university
 daily expenses such as cost of meals
 a lecture fee

Aarhus University is an example university in Denmark that confers honorary professorship.

Honorary Reader, Senior Lecturer, Lecturer 
Persons of lower prestige and academic achievements are appointed at ranks other than professor. Honorary readers are viewed higher than honorary senior lecturer and honorary lecturer. A person can be promoted to the next higher honorary rank on recommendation by the internal university staff and department. Once approved at the university level, the title is then changed.

Honorary Fellow 

In certain UK universities, the title of Honorary Fellow is awarded to people from industry, whom the university wish to recognize and collaborate with. For example, the London School of Economics, Imperial College London, University College London and Queen Mary College London all have provisions for the award of honorary fellow. The University of Hong Kong also awards Honorary Fellow and a recent award was made to Harry Shum from Microsoft Corporation.
Various professional bodies, such as the Royal Institute of British Architects and IET UK also have honorary fellowships.

Visiting Appointments 
This is often confused with honorary academic titles. A visiting professor or reader or senior lecturer or lecturer is someone who has taken time off their primary institution of employment to visit and collaborate with staff from another university. Hence, the visiting appointment is usually for a short period of time, ranging from 3 months up to 1 year. This is not the same as an honorary appointment held in UK universities. 
However, in Germany, visiting lecturers and private lecturers can be conferred the titles of "Honorarprofessor" or "Außerplanmäßiger Professor" respectively after several semesters of successful teaching.

Benefits 
In addition to the honor and recognition, an honorary title sometimes permits non-employees to enjoy the privileges available to regular staff members, such as access to facilities and libraries, temporary stay in university housing, entitlement to a university business card, an email account, and to receive a parking permit.

References